Antioch on the Orontes (Syrian Antioch) was a Hellenistic city in the Seleucid, Roman, and Byzantine Empires, located near present-day Antakya in Turkey.

Antioch may also refer to:

Places

Asia

 Principality of Antioch, a Crusader state with its capital at Antioch on the Orontes
 Antioch, Pisidia, with a corresponding titular see.
 Antioch on the Maeander
 Antiochia ad Cragum, also known as Antiochetta, Antiochia Minor or Antiochoa Parva, in Isauria, later renamed Seleucia
 Antioch on the Cydnus, Tarsus, now in Turkey
 Antioch, Mygdonia, former name of Nisibis; in ancient Mesopotamia, now Nusaybin in Turkey
 Antiochia ad Sarum, now Adana in Turkey

United States
Antioch, Clarke County, Alabama
Antioch, Covington County, Alabama
Antioch, California, the largest city with the name 
Antioch, Florida
Antioch, Harris County, Georgia
Antioch, Polk County, Georgia
Antioch, Troup County, Georgia
Antioch, Illinois
Antioch, Clinton County, Indiana
Antioch, Greene County, Indiana
Antioch, Jay County, Indiana
Antioch, Harrison County, Kentucky
Antioch, Claiborne Parish, Louisiana
Antioch, Jackson Parish, Louisiana
Antioch, Lincoln Parish, Louisiana
Antioch Township, Michigan
Antioch, Missouri
Antioch, Nebraska
Antioch, Ohio
Antioch, Oklahoma
Antioch, South Carolina
Antioch, Tennessee
Antioch, Texas (disambiguation)
Antioch, Virginia
Antioch, West Virginia

Other places
 Passage of Antioch, a strait on the western coast of France
 Antioquia, a department (province) of Colombia

Education
 Antioch College, an independent college in Yellow Springs, Ohio
 Antioch University, a multi-campus university system, including
Antioch University Los Angeles, in Culver City, California
Antioch University McGregor, in Yellow Springs, Ohio

Culture
 Antioch Peverell, a character in the Harry Potter series
 "Antioch", the tune attributed to George Frederick Handel generally used for the Christmas carol "Joy to the World"
"Antioch (Interlude)", a song by Flobots from Noenemies
 "Antioch", a character in The Rock-afire Explosion animatronic band
 Holy Hand Grenade of Antioch, a holy weapon used to destroy the Rabbit of Caerbannog in the film the Monty Python and the Holy Grail

People
 Ignatius of Antioch, a first-century bishop

Transportation
 Antioch, California, United States
Antioch–Pittsburg station, Amtrak station
Antioch station (eBART), eBART station
Antioch station (Illinois), Metra station in Antioch, Illinois, United States

See also
 Antiochia (disambiguation)

el:Αντιόχεια (αποσαφήνιση)
fr:Antioche (homonymie)
ru:Антиохия (значения)
sv:Antiochia